Paite or Päite may refer to:
Paite people, in northeastern India
Paite language, their Sino-Tibetan language
Päite, a village in Ida-Viru County in northeastern Estonia

Language and nationality disambiguation pages